Live Well Financial, Inc. ("LWF") was a privately owned mortgage originator, servicer and investor, licensed in the United States to operate in 46 states. The company offered government-insured Home Equity Conversion Mortgage loans (HECM, commonly known as reverse mortgages), FHA single family mortgage loans, and Fannie Mae conforming loans. LWF is headquartered in Richmond, Virginia and has 3 retail origination branches, 2 in Richmond, Virginia and 1 in San Diego, California, with origination capabilities throughout the United States.  The company and its principals are now the focus of criminal and civil charges alleging a large-scale financial fraud.

History 

Live Well Financial, Inc. was founded in April 2005 by Michael C. Hild, chairman and chief executive officer. In August 2005, the company received approval as a HUD Approved Mortgagee. 

In August 2006, the company was approved as a seller/servicer of HECM with the Federal National Mortgage Association (FNMA). 

In March 2011, the company was approved for HUD Federal Housing Administration (FHA) single-family FHA loans. 

In February 2012, the company was approved as a Government National Mortgage Association (GNMA) Home Equity Conversion Mortgage-Backed Security (HMBS) issuer and issued its first HMBS in April of that year. 

In March 2013, the company was approved for GNMA MBS loans. In June 2013, the company was approved as a seller/servicer of traditional mortgages with FNMA. 

During the  first quarter of 2014 the company opened a retail call center in San Diego, CA. And in the fourth quarter of 2014 it opened a retail call center in Richmond, VA. In August 2014, the company acquired a securities portfolio with a balance exceeding $530 million (notional) and hired a NYC based trading team. LWF has originated and serviced more than $3.3 billion in mortgage loans in the U.S. and Puerto Rico. 

As of May 3, 2019, Live well Financial is shutting down active operations. All forward loans and loan applications currently in process with them (without closing documents finalized) are being notified that they are not funding. Employment status of employees is unknown at this time.

Scope

The company originates FHA Insured HECM reverse mortgages, FHA single-family loans, Ginnie Mae HMBS and MBS mortgages, and Fannie Mae conforming loans. LWF is HUD approved in 81 geographical areas. LWF has approximately 300 employees, including loan officers, account executives, and support personnel. 

LWF is vertically integrated, with a full complement of products and business lines including origination, servicing and investment management. Licensed in 46 states with a full suite of regulatory approvals including HUD, FHA, GNMA, and FNMA.

References

External links
 Live Well

Financial services companies of the United States
American companies established in 2005
Financial services companies established in 2005
Mortgage lenders of the United States
Companies based in Richmond, Virginia
Companies based in San Diego